Monika Starosta (born 21 December 1972) is a former professional tennis player from Poland.

Starosta competed on the ITF circuit in the 1990s and reached a best singles ranking of 362 in the world. 

During her career she appeared in one Fed Cup tie for Poland, against Belarus in 1997.

ITF finals

Singles (0–3)

Doubles (0–3)

See also
List of Poland Fed Cup team representatives

References

External links
 
 
 

1972 births
Living people
Polish female tennis players
20th-century Polish women